Mischa Hiller (born 1962) is a British novelist. His novel Sabra Zoo won the Commonwealth Writers' Prize, best first book prize, presented in Sydney, Australia in May 2011.

Personal life

He grew up in the United Kingdom and Dar es Salaam, Tanzania. He lives in Cambridge, England. Hiller suffers from Myalgic Encephalomyelitis, diagnosed in 2006 after ten years of illness.

Works
Sabra Zoo, Telegram Books, 2010, 
Fuga dall'inferno. Una storia palestinese, Translator S. Montis, Newton Compton, 2010, 
Shake Off, Telegram Books, 13 September 2011, 
 Disengaged

Reviews

References

External links
Author's website
Sabra Zoo website
"Review and author interview: Sabra Zoo – Mischa Hiller", A Common Reader, 12 February 2010
"A novelist goes undercover", The Saudi Gazette, Susannah Tarbush

21st-century British novelists
Living people
1962 births
British male novelists
21st-century British male writers